The Saint Vincent and the Grenadines cricket team is a cricket team representing Saint Vincent and the Grenadines and is a member of the Windward Islands Cricket Board of Control. For cricketing purposes, players from Saint Vincent and the Grenadines generally represent the Windward Islands at domestic level and the West Indies at international level. However, the St Vincent & Grenadines team did appear four times in its own right at List A level in the 2002–03 Red Stripe Bowl, the domestic one day competition.  The team had also played as a separate entity in matches which held Twenty20 status (Stanford 20/20) and they continues to compete in domestic Windward Islands cricket competitions including the Windward Islands two-day and Twenty20 cricket championships.

Players

International Players

A number of St Vincent & Grenadines cricketers have represented the West Indies internationally.

 Apps denotes the number of appearances the player has made.
 Runs denotes the number of runs scored by the player.
 Wkts denotes the number of wickets taken by the player.

Many other Vincentian players have represented the Windward Islands cricket team domestically in the West Indies Regional Super50, Regional Four Day Competition and the Caribbean Twenty20.

St Vincent & Grenadines players on the current Windward Islands team
Sunil Ambris
Delorn Johnson
Ray Jordan
Obed McCoy

See also
List of Windward Islands first-class cricketers

Squad

Current squad

Players with international caps are listed in bold.

  2014 St Vincent & Grenadines 32 man trial squad selected for the 2014 Windward Islands domestic 2-day and 20/20 Championships.
  2014 St Vincent & Greanadines 20 man training squad selected for the 2014 Windward Islands domestic 2-day and 20/20 Championships.

2002/03 Red Stripe Bowl Squad (List A)

Players with international caps are listed in bold.

Stanford 20/20

The Saint Vincent & Greanadines national team competed at the 2006 and 2007/08 Stanford 20/20 tournaments held in Antigua.
2006 SVG Stanford 20/20 Squad
2008 SVG Stanford 20/20 Squad

National cricket stadium

Notes

National cricket teams
C